Douglas Richard Brown (born 23 February 1972) is a Jamaican-born cricketer who plays for the Turks and Caicos Islands.  Brown is a right-handed batsman who bowls right-arm fast-medium.

Brown played a single Twenty20 match for the Turks and Caicos Islands against Montserrat in the 2008 Stanford 20/20 at the Stanford Cricket Ground.  He was run out for 4 runs in this match by Lionel Baker, with the Turks and Caicos Islands making just 67 runs in their twenty overs.  Montserrat went on to win the match by 9 wickets.

References

External links
Douglas Brown at ESPNcricinfo
Douglas Brown at CricketArchive

1972 births
Living people
Turks and Caicos Islands cricketers
Jamaican emigrants to the Turks and Caicos Islands